Raymond James Kemp (6 April 1918 – 27 December 1994) was a New Zealand cricketer who played first-class cricket for Wellington from 1946 to 1949.

Kemp was a right-handed batsman. His only century was the 152 he scored against Auckland in the 1947-48 Plunket Shield. He was selected to represent the North Island later that season and made 59 and 5 in the North Island's narrow victory over the South Island.

References

External links
 
 

1918 births
1994 deaths
New Zealand cricketers
Cricketers from Wellington City
Wellington cricketers
North Island cricketers